Alavedra might refer to:

Baldiri Alavedra (1944–2020), Spanish footballer
Macià Alavedra, Spanish politician